Earl or Mormaer of Strathearn is a title of Scottish nobility, referring to the region of Strathearn in southern Perthshire. Of unknown origin, the mormaers are attested for the first time in a document perhaps dating to 1115. The first known mormaer, Malise I, is mentioned by Ailred of Rievaulx as leading native Scots in the company of King David at the Battle of the Standard, 1138. The last ruler of the Strathearn line was Malise, also Earl of Caithness and Orkney, who had his earldom forfeited by King Edward Balliol. In 1344 it was regranted by King David to Maurice de Moravia, a royal favourite who had a vague claim to the earldom as Malise's nephew and also stepfather.

Strathearn has since been used as a peerage title for James Stewart, an illegitimate son of King James V of Scotland, who was created Lord Abernethy and Strathearn and Earl of Moray in 1562. In 1631, William Graham, 7th Earl of Menteith was confirmed in this dignity as heir of line of Euphemia Stewart, Countess of Strathearn (d. 1415), but was forced to settle for the less prestigious title of the Earl of Airth in 1633.

It has also been granted to members of the royal family in the titles of Duke of Cumberland and Strathearn (created 1766, extinct 1790), Duke of Kent and Strathearn (created 1799, extinct 1820) and Duke of Connaught and Strathearn (created 1874, extinct 1943).

On 29 April 2011, the title was recreated when Queen Elizabeth II conferred the title on Prince William of Wales in the peerage of the United Kingdom. As a result, on marriage his wife Catherine became Countess of Strathearn. This was the title which William used when in Scotland until receiving the title of Duke of Rothesay in September 2022.

Ancient Earls of Strathearn

 
Malise I (fl. 1138)
Ferteth (fl. 1160)
Gille-Brigte or Gilbert (1171–1223)
Robert (1223–1245)
Malise II (1245–1271)
Malise III (1271–1317), buried beside the high altar of Inchaffray Abbey
Malise IV (1317–1329), captured his father
Malise V (1330–1334) (d. 1350 as Earl of Caithness)

Earls of Strathearn, Moray line beginning 1344
Maurice de Moravia, Earl of Strathearn (d.1346)

Earls of Strathearn, Stewart/Graham line beginning 1357
Robert Stewart, Earl of Strathearn (1316–1390) (passed to son after becoming King Robert II in 1371)
David Stewart, Earl of Strathearn (1355–1390)
Euphemia Stewart, Countess of Strathearn (d.1415)
m. Patrick Graham
Malise Graham, Earl of Strathearn (1410–after 1427), deprived of the peerage before 1427
Walter Stewart, Earl of Strathearn (d. 1437)

Earls of Strathearn, Mountbatten-Windsor line beginning 2011

Prince William, Duke of Cambridge, Earl of Strathearn, Baron Carrickfergus (b. 1982)

The heir apparent is the present holder's son, Prince George of Rothesay (born 2013).

Line of succession

   Prince William, Duke of Rothesay (born 1982) 
  (1) Prince George of Rothesay (b. 2013)
  (2) Prince Louis of Rothesay (b. 2018)

See also
Duke of Connaught and Strathearn
Duke of Cumberland and Strathearn
Duke of Kent and Strathearn

References

Bibliography
 Neville, Cynthia J., Native Lordship in Medieval Scotland: the Earldoms of Strathearn and Lennox, c. 1140–1365, Dublin: Four Courts Press, 2005 
--do.--The Earls of Strathearn from the twelfth to the mid fourteenth century, with an edition of their written acts. 2 vols. 1983. PhD thesis, University of Aberdeen. (http://digitool.abdn.ac.uk:80/webclient/Deliv...&pid=130786)

 
Extinct earldoms in the Peerage of Scotland
Perth and Kinross
Forfeited earldoms in the Peerage of Scotland
Earldoms in the Peerage of the United Kingdom
Noble titles created in 1344
Noble titles created in 1357
Noble titles created in 2011
William, Prince of Wales